"(Without You) What Do I Do with Me" is a song written by L. David Lewis, David Chamberlain and Royce Porter, and recorded by American country music artist Tanya Tucker.  It was released in October 1991 as the second single and title track from the album What Do I Do with Me.  The song reached #2 on the Billboard Hot Country Singles & Tracks chart, behind Collin Raye's "Love, Me".

Chart performance

Year-end charts

References

1992 singles
Tanya Tucker songs
Capitol Records Nashville singles
Song recordings produced by Jerry Crutchfield
Songs written by Royce Porter
1991 songs
Songs written by David Chamberlain (songwriter)